Sir Hector Maclean, 2nd Baronet of Morvern (c. 1620 – 1651) was the 18th Clan Chief of Clan Maclean from 1649 to 1651. He died without leaving a son as an heir.

Biography
Hector was the son of Sir Lachlan Maclean, 1st Baronet and succeeded him at his death in 1649. His mother was Mary MacLeod, the second daughter of Sir Roderick MacLeod. At Hector's death in 1651, he was succeeded as Clan Maclean Chief by his brother, Sir Allan Maclean, 3rd Baronet.

Hector was killed fighting for the Royalists at the battle of Inverkeithing. It was during this battle that seven brothers died protecting their Clan chief. Each brother crying "Another for Hector" as they stepped forward to protect him. Fear eile airson Eachuinn (from Scottish Gaelic: "Another for Hector") became one of the two slogans used by Clan Maclean.

Ancestors

Notes

References

1620s births
1651 deaths
Hector
Baronets in the Baronetage of Nova Scotia